Armin Delong (29 January 1925, Bartovice, Czechoslovakia – 5 October 2017, Brno) was a Czechoslovak physicist. He was the founder of electron microscopy in the former Czechoslovakia. In 1990, he served briefly as a Minister in the Czechoslovak government of Prime Minister Marián Čalfa. At the same time, in 1990, he was elected Vice-Chairman of the Czech Academy of Sciences.

References

1925 births
2017 deaths
Czechoslovak physicists
Government ministers of Czechoslovakia
Czech people of French descent
Politicians from Ostrava